The canton of Allassac is an administrative division of the Corrèze department, south-central France. It was created at the French canton reorganisation which came into effect in March 2015. Its seat is in Allassac.

It consists of the following communes:
 
 Allassac
 Donzenac
 Estivaux
 Orgnac-sur-Vézère
 Perpezac-le-Noir
 Sadroc
 Saint-Bonnet-l'Enfantier
 Sainte-Féréole
 Saint-Pardoux-l'Ortigier
 Saint-Viance
 Troche
 Vigeois

References

Cantons of Corrèze